Alec Gray (1895-1986) was an English nurseryman and horticulturalist. He was notable as an authority on and breeder of daffodils, having developed 110 new cultivars over a career spanning 60 years. In his free time he was also an enthusiastic archaeologist and poet.

Life and career

Alec Gray was born in London in 1895. During he First World War he served in the Royal Marines, which lead him to be awarded the Belgian Croix Gueve. After the First World War had ended he qualified in fruit growing and worked in North Devon before managing the Gulval Ministry Experimental Station near Penzance.<ref name=tompsett55>Tompsett, Golden Harvest: The Story of Daffodil Growing in Cornwall and the Isles of Scilly'", 2006, p.55</ref> In the 1923 he moved on to work as a farm manager at the Duchy Farm on the Scilly Isles, which is where his passion for daffodils and the isle of Scilly was kindled. He established a small collection of daffodil varieties, and by the 1930s started to register new varieties himself. Gray would remain working at Dutchy Farm up until 1963 and would continue to visit the Scilly Isles on a yearly basis after that.

During the 1940s Gray would found the business Broadleigh Gardens. He would also go onto established a nursery at Treswithian near Camborne where he ran a nursery business throughout the 1950s and 1960s. He kept Broadleigh Gardens for many years before selling it in 1972. Gray was also an amateur archaeologist and was one of the first people to excavate a stone age village at Bant's Carn. In 1972 his and others archaeological findings would be published collectively in the book, Cornish Archaeology volume 11. In 1979 he would also go onto publish a book of his own book titled To Scilly, which was filled with poems he had written inspired by his time at the Isles of Scilly.

Gray specialised in miniature daffodils, many bred from plants collected on trips to Southern Europe. Whilst some miniatures had been bred previously, Gray effectively created the modern form of miniature daffodil, originally as an inadvertent accident during his attempts to breed early-flowering larger varieties. Amongst the cultivars he subsequently developed was Narcissus 'Tête-à-Tête', first grown in the 1940s, and which became the most widely grown miniature variety despite Gray initially being unimpressed with the plant. "Tête-à-Tête" remains an extremely commercially significant variety: by 2006 it made up some 34% of the total Dutch daffodil bulb trade, with 17 million pots sold at auction. A number of his other varieties won the Royal Horticultural Society Award of Garden Merit, including "Elka", "Jumblie", "Minnow" and "Sun Disc".

Gray retired in 1984 and died only two years later in 1986. After his death, Gray's daffodil collection was sold to Walter Stagg and then to Lady Skelmersdale of Broadleigh Gardens, Taunton. The various narcissus species, hybrids and cultivars are now part of a National Collection at Broadleigh Gardens where they are maintained, propagated and can be visited.

 Narcissus cultivars 
Below is a list of some of the Narcissus'' cultivars bred by Alec Gray.

Bambi, Kehelland, Little beauty, W. P, Milner, Elizabeth Prentice, Hawera, Ivory gate, Lemon heart, Rosedown, Silver chimes, Thalia, Tresamble, Baby doll, Beryl, Cornet, February gold, February silver, Larkelly, Le beau, Roger, Trewirgie, Bobbysoxer, Cherie, Cora Ann, Nirvana, Skylon, Sugar bush, Sweetness, Trevithian, Canary bird, Goldsithney, Kenellis, Tête-à-tête, Elka, Jumblie, Minnow, Sun disc.

References

English horticulturists
1895 births
1986 deaths